The Chapin and Gore Building is a historic building located at 63 East Adams Street in downtown Chicago, Illinois. The distilling company of Chapin and Gore had the building constructed in 1904 for their business; the original building consisted a first-floor bar and store and offices and warehouse space in the remainder of the building. Architectural partners Richard E. Schmidt and Hugh M. G. Garden designed the building, which has a functional plan but includes substantial ornamentation such as terra cotta and brickwork. The building's ornamental capitals and cornice were removed in the 1950s. The building was listed on the National Register of Historic Places on June 27, 1979, and later designated as a Chicago Landmark on January 21, 1982.

The Chapin and Gore Building is currently the home of the Chicago Symphony Orchestra administration. It is part of the Symphony Center campus, attached in 1997 to Orchestra Hall. The Forte restaurant and café is on the ground floor, serving orchestra patrons and the public.

See also
Chicago Landmark

References

Commercial buildings completed in 1904
Chicago Landmarks
Commercial buildings on the National Register of Historic Places in Chicago
1904 establishments in Illinois